Edward 'Eddie' Christopher Ballard (born 15 August 1989) is an English cricketer.  Ballard is a right-handed batsman who bowls leg break.  He was born at Harlow, Essex.

Having been educated at Hockerill Anglo-European College, Ballard undertook his university studies at Anglia Ruskin University in Cambridge.  While studying there, he made his first-class debut for Cambridge UCCE against Somerset in 2008.  He made three further first-class appearances for the team, the last of which came against Essex in 2009.  He struggled against the first-class opponents he played against, scoring a total of 34 runs in his four first-class matches, which came at an average of 5.66, with a high score of 33. In addition to playing first-class cricket, Ballard has played minor counties cricket for Hertfordshire from 2009–16 and from 2016 for Cambridgeshire.

References

External links
Eddie Ballard at ESPNcricinfo

1989 births
Living people
Sportspeople from Harlow
People educated at Hockerill Anglo-European College
Alumni of Anglia Ruskin University
English cricketers
Cambridge MCCU cricketers
Hertfordshire cricketers
Cambridgeshire cricketers